The queen is a playing card with a picture of a queen on it. In many European languages, the king and queen begin with the same letter so the latter is often called dame (lady) or variations thereof. In French playing cards, the usual rank of a queen is between the king and the jack. In tarot decks, it outranks the knight which in turn outranks the jack. In the Spanish deck and some Italian decks, the Queen does not exist and the Knight appears in them instead, with the same role and value.

In several card games, including the middle eastern Trex and French Barbu, the queen is a major card to avoid taking, with each queen taken inflicting a penalty on the player. Similarly, in Hearts, the queen of spades is to be avoided, and is called a variety of unsavoury names.

In the Paris pattern, each court card is identified as a particular historical or mythological personage as follows:

Cultural references
Regarding the anonymous nursery rhyme, "The Queen of Hearts" (published 1782), Katherine Elwes Thomas claims, in The Real Personage of Mother Goose, that the Queen of Hearts was based on Elizabeth of Bohemia. Benham, in his book Playing Cards: History of the Pack and Explanations of its Many Secrets, notes that French playing cards from the mid-17th century have Judith from the Hebrew Bible as the Queen of Hearts. See also: Queen of Hearts (Alice's Adventures in Wonderland).

See also
 List of poker hand nicknames
 Three-card Monte

References

Queen